Not So Quiet on the Western Front may refer to:

 Not So Quiet on the Western Front (album)
 Not So Quiet on the Western Front (film), directed by Monty Banks

See also
 All Quiet on the Western Front (disambiguation)